Philip William Kirsh (born 1964/65) is a South African businessman, the son of the South African-born UK-based billionaire property developer Nathan Kirsh.

Early life
Kirsh has a bachelor's degree from the University of Cape Town, a law degree from Mansfield College, Oxford, and a master's degree in law from New York University.

Career
Kirsh founded the Hot & Crusty bakery chain in New York, and in 1990, was its president.

He is a director of KI Corporation.

Kirsh also works with the Kirsh Foundation on education and other initiatives.

Personal life
In 1990, he married Rona Gluck, daughter of New York diamond wholesalers Oscar and Tikva Gluck, at the Pierre Hotel, in a ceremony performed by Rabbi David B. Kahane.

Through various trusts, Kirsh and his sister own four apartments in the Trump Tower, purchased for more than $56 million.

References

1960s births
Living people
People from Manhattan
University of Cape Town alumni
Alumni of Mansfield College, Oxford
New York University School of Law alumni
Businesspeople from New York City
20th-century South African businesspeople
21st-century South African businesspeople